Minacraga argentata is a moth in the family Dalceridae. It was described by Walter Hopp in 1922. It is found in Colombia, eastern Brazil and Peru. The habitat consists of tropical wet, moist and premontane wet forests.

References

Moths described in 1922
Dalceridae